Walding is a surname. Notable people with the surname include:

Jim Walding (1937–2007), Canadian politician
Joe Walding (1926–1985), New Zealand politician
Mitch Walding (born 1992),  American baseball player